Bauhinia japonica is a species of flowering plant in the family Fabaceae which can be found in Guangdong, Hainan and Japan.

Description
The leaf blade surface is shiny and hairless. The flowers bloom from January to May while the fruits ripe from June to September.

References

External links

Further reading

japonica
Flora of Guangdong
Flora of Hainan
Flora of Japan